Vlado Poslek (born 16 October 1969) is a Croatian sprint canoer who competed in the early 1990s. At the 1992 Summer Olympics in Barcelona, he was eliminated in the semifinals of the C-1 1000 m event, placing 13th overall.

References
Sports-Reference.com profile

1969 births
Canoeists at the 1992 Summer Olympics
Croatian male canoeists
Living people
Olympic canoeists of Croatia